IDAS (Interactive Defence and Attack System for Submarines) is a medium-range missile currently being developed for the Type 209 and Type 212A submarine class of the German Navy.

IDAS technology is based on the IRIS-T air-to-air missile which primarily targets aerial threats, such as ASW helicopters, but also against small or medium-sized surface vessels or coastal land targets. It is currently being developed by Diehl Defence and HDW, which is a part of Thyssenkrupp Marine Systems (TKMS), to be fired from Type 212's torpedo tubes. IDAS will be fibre-optic guided and officially has a range of approx. 40 km. Four missiles will fit in one torpedo tube, stored in a magazine. First deliveries of IDAS for the German Navy and operational service were planned from 2014 on.

Except for a few years of testing by the Royal Navy and Israeli Navy of the short range TV guided Blowpipe (missile) in the 1970s the IDAS system is the world's first missile which gives submarines the capability to engage air threats whilst submerged, and the first tube-launched missile that does not emerge in a capsule, but is fired directly from the torpedo tubes.

Alternatively, IDAS could be in theory fired from the Gabler Maschinenbau TRIPLE-M mast system, but, at least in the new Type 216 submarine currently under development, IDAS will be fired as normal from the torpedo tubes, while the Muraena will be the primary weapons option for its TRIPLE-M system.

In May 2013, the Turkish company ROKETSAN and the German IDAS Consortium formed by Thyssenkrupp Marine Systems and Diehl BGT Defence signed a cooperation agreement to develop and supply the submarine-launched IDAS (= Interactive Defence and Attack System for Submarines) missile

References

External links
 Diehl BGT Defence official website
  First test of IDAS by the German Navy

Naval surface-to-air missiles
Surface-to-air missiles of Germany
21st-century surface-to-air missiles
Post–Cold War weapons of Germany
Anti-ship missiles of Germany
Proposed weapons